Max Wilson (born August 22, 1972 in Hamburg, West Germany) is a racing driver of Brazilian parentage.

Racing career

Junior formulae
Wilson started his motor racing career in 1985 in go-karts. He moved into single-seaters in 1993, when he was offered a ride in the Brazilian Formula Ford Championship. In 1994 he moved to the Brazilian Formula Chevrolet Championship and finished 2nd overall, behind Felipe Giaffone.

Formula 3
Again, Wilson graduated up a level into Formula Three Sudamericana for the 1995 season. Again he finished 2nd in the championship, this time behind Ricardo Zonta. After testing for the WTS-F3-Team, owned by Michael Schumacher's personal manager Willi Weber, Wilson was signed by the BSR squad to compete at Magny-Cours for the penultimate round of the German Formula Three Championship that year. He finished 5th and 6th in the double-header event.

Wilson moved to Munich at the beginning of 1996 to race in the German Formula Three Championship. Willi Weber had sold his WTS-F3-Team to aspiring team owner Georgis Tokmakidis, and Wilson was signed to race with Dutchman Tom Coronel as a team-mate. But the team struggled with personnel problems; Coronel ended up never racing for the team and a variety of drivers walked in and out. After winning a pre-season non-championship, the team's subsequent results were disappointing and led to Wilson, one of the championship favorites, leaving the team after two races. He then decided to join the Italian Prema Power F3 Team as a team mate to André Couto from mid-season on, and managed to win one championship round in wet conditions at Diepholz, despite the car having an underpowered Fiat engine. In those days almost every car on the grid was powered by the superior Opel Spiess engine. Wilson finished 10th in the championship.

Sportscars
Wilson was offered a drive with Porsche to contest the 1997 FIA GT1 championship and the Le Mans 24 Hours but turned down the offer to prioritise Formula 3000 and, ultimately, Formula 1.

Formula 3000, Formula 1 and Indycars
In 1997, Edenbridge Racing chose him to drive one of their Formula 3000 cars, alongside Werner Lupberger. He finished 5th in the championship, 19 points behind champion Ricardo Zonta after 10 rounds. He stayed on at Edenbridge for the 1998 season, and also became a test driver for the Williams F1 team. At the end of 1999, Wilson was offered a drive with the ailing Minardi team for the 2000 season but a lack of financial backing saw him lose the ride at the last minute to Gastón Mazzacane, a less experienced but more financially solvent driver. He spent 2000 as an F1 test driver for Michelin as the tyre manufacturer prepared to re-enter Formula One competition in 2001. Unable to secure a full-time Formula One ride for the 2001 season, Wilson returned to the United States and joined the Arciero-Blair Racing team to contest the Champ Car World Series.

Touring cars
At the end of 1996, he drove one race in the International Touring Car Championship at Interlagos for Alfa Romeo, as all manufacturers had one local driver to improve interest among local spectators. He led the second race for a while, eventually finishing in 2nd. Failing to raise a full Champ Car budget for 2002, Wilson moved to Australia where he joined the Ford V8 Supercars team Briggs Motor Sport. In his second outing in a V8 Supercar, Wilson qualified fifth at the Clipsal 500 in Adelaide. Racing for Dick Johnson Racing in 2003, he took his first podium finish in the championship at the final round of the year.

2004 saw Wilson fail to finish five of the rounds, driving for Triple 8 Racing. In 2005, a last-minute arrangement saw Wilson compete in the championship with Team Dynamik after his former Briggs Motor Sport team mate Tony Longhurst became the entrant for one of the team's Holden Commodore VZs. His 2005 campaign included a fifth place in the final race in China and a top ten finish at the Oran Park round.

For 2006, Wilson moved to the WPS Racing team, but immediately prior to the 2008 season the team folded, leaving Wilson without a drive. He returned to his native Brazil but did drive the Australian enduro season with Brad Jones Racing, finishing fifth with Brad Jones at the Bathurst 1000 having led the race in parts. In 2009 he returned to racing in Brazil competing in the Stock Car Brasil, winning the title in 2010.

Racing record

Career summary

Complete International Formula 3000 results
(key) (Races in bold indicate pole position; races in italics indicate fastest lap.)

American open wheel racing results

FedEx Championship Series
(key) (Races in bold indicate pole position)

V8 Supercar Championship results
(key) (Races in bold indicate pole position) (Races in italics indicate fastest lap)

Complete Stock Car Brasil results

Complete Bathurst 1000 results

External links
Articles, Photos & Video of Max Wilson on Motorsport.com
Profile on Speedsport Magazine Germany
Profile on Driver Database
Profile on Racing Reference USA

Sportspeople from Hamburg
Supercars Championship drivers
1972 births
Champ Car drivers
German emigrants to Brazil
German Formula Three Championship drivers
Formula 3 Sudamericana drivers
German racing drivers
Living people
Brazilian racing drivers
International Formula 3000 drivers
Stock Car Brasil drivers
Opel Team BSR drivers
Prema Powerteam drivers
Dick Johnson Racing drivers